The  (Spanish for "Conception") was an early-16th-century Spanish carrack during the Age of Discovery, chiefly remembered as part of the Molucca Fleet that made up the 1519–1522 Magellan–Elcano expedition that attempted to find a Southwestern Passage around South America to the Spice Islands (now Indonesia's Malukus) and subsequently completed the first circumnavigation of the globe. The  itself did not complete the journey, needing to be scuttled in the Philippines in 1521.

History 
The  held 90 tonels and cost 228,750 maravedís to construct. Leaving Seville on 10 August 1519, the 's crew consisted of 44 men under Captain Gaspar de Quesada. Juan Sebastián Elcano was its boatswain. João Serrão commanded the ship across the Pacific, where he became joint leader of the expedition after Ferdinand Magellan's death during a 1521 raid on Mactan Island, whose leader Lapulapu had refused to convert or pay tribute. When Elcano then joined Duarte Barbosa in refusing to free Magellan's Malay slave Enrique, Enrique convinced the Cebu raja Humabon to massacre the Spanish.

Elcano would subsequently lead the  back to Seville, becoming the first ship to circumnavigate the globe.

Notes

References

Citations

Bibliography

 
 
 .

Exploration ships
Age of Discovery ships
Magellan expedition
16th-century ships